The Chaser is a 2008 South Korean action thriller film starring Kim Yoon-seok and Ha Jung-woo. It was directed by Na Hong-jin in his directorial debut. Inspired by real-life Korean serial killer Yoo Young-chul, certain scenes were shot on location around Mangwon-dong in the Mapo District, Seoul.

Plot 
Joong-ho is a dishonest ex-detective turned pimp who is in financial trouble because two of his prostitutes have gone missing. One night, he commands Mi-jin to service a customer, despite her protests over her sickness. Joong-ho then realizes this customer was the last to see his missing girls. Believing that this customer is trafficking his women, Joong-ho nevertheless sends Mi-jin in so that she can forward the customer's address to him. Joong-ho contacts his old police task force for help, but they cannot assist because the mayor of Seoul, whom they were guarding, has been attacked with feces; this results in the police suffering a media firestorm.

The customer, Yeong-min, takes Mi-jin back to a house but Mi-jin fails to contact Joong-ho due to the bathroom having no cell service. Yeong-min binds Mi-jin, but her struggles prevent her murder with a chisel, so Yeong-min hits her with a hammer, knocking her out. Just then, an elderly couple from the local church arrive, inquiring about the real house owner, Mr. Park; they recognize his dog. Yeong-min then invites the elderly couple in and murders them.

Joong-ho, only aware of the customer's district, conducts a search. Yeong-min tries to ditch the couple's car, but collides with Joong-ho's car. Joong-ho's suspicions are aroused as Yeong-min has blood on his shirt and refuses to give his phone number. Joong-ho calls the customer's number and Yeong-min's phone rings. Yeong-min flees but is caught and beaten by Joong-ho. Both men are arrested by a local cop. At the station, Yeong-min casually admits that he committed nine murders. Competing police divisions argue over who will investigate the high-profile unsolved murders in the area.

Despite the confession, the police have no physical evidence so they cannot detain Yeong-min for long. Yeong-min reveals Mi-jin is alive, but the police doubt it. Joong-ho goes to Mi-jin's apartment to collect DNA samples, and from there he takes Mi-jin's daughter Eun-ji with him while he follows up a lead in Yeong-min's hometown. Joong-ho learns that Yeong-min was jailed for three years for lobotomizing his own nephew. Another prostitute informs Joong-ho that Yeong-min is impotent. When Yeong-min is questioned about his impotency being part of his motive, he attacks the interrogator. Joong-ho's assistant finds a room where Yeong-min had once lived; Joong-ho discovers religious drawings on the room's walls. Eun-ji wanders off while following a woman who looks like her mother, then meets with an accident and is brought to hospital by Joong-ho.

Yeong-min provides a false lead after being again beaten by Joong-ho. The prosecutor discovers Yeong-min's injuries and demands Yeong-min's release, refusing to wait for DNA test results. Saying that Yeong-min's arrest will be seen as the police's attempt to save face, the prosecutor demands for Joong-ho's arrest for injuring Yeong-min. Joong-ho is handcuffed and attacks his former teammates to escape; one of them frees him.

Meanwhile, Mi-jin freed herself and escaped from the house. Badly injured, she finds help at a nearby corner shop, and hides in the back. The police are informed, but the nearest officers are fast asleep. Yeong-min stops at the same shop to buy cigarettes. Not knowing Yeong-min is the attacker himself, the shopkeeper tells him about Mi-jin's story, asking him to stay to protect them from the attacker (which is himself) while they await the police. Yeong-min uses the shopkeeper's hammer to murder both her and Mi-jin. Alerted by police sirens, Joong-ho arrives finding the police have cordoned off the bloody shop. Yeong-min escapes off-camera back to Mr. Park's house, where he stores Mi-jin's severed head and hands in a fish tank. Yeong-min buries the elderly couple and kills Mr. Park's dog.

The humiliated police throw everything into the search for Yeong-min, while the story is leaked to the public. A distraught Joong-ho follows a lead to the local church, then notices that a church statue matches the drawings he had seen in Yeong-min's old room. As Mr. Park was the sculptor and Yeong-min his "assistant", the deacon points Joong-ho to Mr. Park's house.

Joong-ho enters the residence, interrupting Yeong-min's departure. They fight, with Joong-ho ultimately getting the upper hand, but the police arrive and restrain Joong-ho from killing Yeong-min. Yeong-Min is taken away while the police excavate the yard, finding several bodies.

The film ends with Joong-ho sitting silently by Eun-ji in her hospital room, holding her hand.

Cast 
 Kim Yoon-seok as Eom Joong-ho, pimp and former police officer
 Ha Jung-woo as Je Yeong-min, serial killer
 Seo Young-hee as Kim Mi-jin, prostitute
 Koo Bon-woong as Oh-jot, Eom Joong-ho's assistant
 Kim Yoo-jung as Eun-ji, Mi-jin's daughter
 Jung In-gi as Detective Lee
 Park Hyo-joo as Detective Oh
 Choi Jung-woo as Chief of Police
 Min Kyeong-jin as Team chief
 Oh Yeon-ah as Sung-hee
 Kim Sun-young as Ji-yeong

Release

Box office
The Chaser was released in South Korea on February 14, 2008. On its opening weekend it grossed  and was ranked second at the box office, behind American film Jumper. The Chaser received a total of 5,120,630 admissions nationwide, which made it the third most popular film in South Korea in 2008, after The Good, the Bad, the Weird and Scandal Makers.

Critical response

On review aggregator Rotten Tomatoes, The Chaser holds an approval rating of 80%, based on 30 reviews, and an average rating of 6.7/10. Its consensus reads, "A frantic and taut Korean serial killer thriller. One classy, if bloody and messy, gut wrencher of a movie." On Metacritic, the film has a weighted average score of 64 out of 100, based on 11 critics, indicating "generally positive reviews".

Awards and nominations

Remakes and similar productions 
William Monahan was in early discussions to write the script, with Leonardo DiCaprio named as a potential star; no deals have been set. Monahan and DiCaprio were both involved in Martin Scorsese's The Departed, a successful remake of the classic Hong Kong thriller Infernal Affairs . Murder 2 , a 2011 Indian Bollywood psychological thriller film, is an unofficial remake of The Chaser.

References

External links 
 
 
 
 
 

2008 films
2008 action thriller films
2000s crime action films
2008 crime thriller films
South Korean action thriller films
South Korean crime thriller films
South Korean crime action films
South Korean serial killer films
South Korean detective films
South Korean neo-noir films
Police detective films
2000s chase films
Films set in Seoul
Films shot in Seoul
Films shot in Busan
South Korean chase films
Films directed by Na Hong-jin
Best Picture Grand Bell Award winners
Showbox films
2000s Korean-language films
2000s psychological horror films
2008 directorial debut films
South Korean films based on actual events
Grand Prize Paeksang Arts Award (Film) winners
2000s South Korean films